Yasin Abu Bakr (born Lennox Philip; 19 October 1941 – 21 October 2021) was a Trinidad and Tobago religious leader who led the Jamaat al Muslimeen, a Muslim group in Trinidad and Tobago. The group staged an attempted coup d’état in 1990.

Life
Abu Bakr was born Lennox Philip in Trinidad and Tobago and grew up in a suburb of Port-of-Spain as the eighth of fifteen children. He would later attend and graduate from Queen's Royal College, and would spend time on his tertiary studies in Toronto, Canada.

Abu Bakr would later convert to Islam, although there are two conflicting descriptions of how it took place. One story states it occurred in 1969 after an Egyptian preacher visited Trinidad. The other story states it occurred in the early 1970s while still in Canada, and that he would return to Trinidad already converted in 1973. He would change his name shortly after converting.

In the 1970s he lived in Libya as a guest of Muamar Gaddafi. Upon his return to Trinidad and Tobago he founded Jamaat al Muslimeen. 

Abu Bakr collapsed and died at his home on 21 October 2021 at the age of 80.

Coup

In 1990, 100 of Abu Bakr's followers stormed the Parliament of Trinidad and Tobago and took the Prime Minister hostage. Abu Bakr surrendered to police six days later, and spent two years in jail.

Personal life 
Abu Bakr's son, Fuad, would later embark on a political course, eventually becoming the leader of the New National Vision party, a minor political party founded in 1994 in Trinidad and Tobago. His attempt at obtaining a seat in the 2020 general elections proved unsuccessful.

References

External links
 Angela Potter, "Trinidad Muslims Being Closely Monitored", Associated Press, 1 November 2001.
 Robin Walker, "Profile: Jamaat al Muslimeen", BBC News, 3 June 2007.
 Danny Gold, "The Islamic Leader Who Tried to Overthrow Trinidad Has Mellowed… a Little", Vice News, 30 May 2014.

1941 births
2021 deaths
Trinidad and Tobago religious leaders
Trinidad and Tobago rebels
Trinidad and Tobago Muslims
Converts to Islam
Alumni of Queen's Royal College, Trinidad